London Plus  was the name of the BBC's regional news programme for southeastern England. Launched on Monday 3 September 1984, the programme represented the BBC's attempt to boost regional news service for the South East. Prior to the launch of London Plus, BBC South East did not have its own dedicated team of presenting staff and the teatime regional news programme for the South East was delivered by presenters of the main national programme (first Nationwide, then Sixty Minutes) although since the start of 1982 the teatime programme had been called Nationwide – South East at Six.

From Monday 2 September 1985, London viewers finally got the same level of regional news as the rest of the UK when the London Plus team began to provide weekday regional news at lunchtime, mid-afternoons and Saturday teatimes for the first time. Previously, on weekday lunchtimes, London and south east viewers received a Financial Report and the Saturday teatime five-minute regional opt-out had been filled with a national sports round-up called Today's Sport.

The original 1984 title music sequences, and for the two series was composed by George Fenton, with the second and final being in 1986, which was a slightly more serious tone for the hard-hitting headlines revamp. Some versions of the BBC's Newsnight were also recorded at the same studio, one in 1982, after this from 1993, Abbey Road studios.

The programme was replaced in 1989 by Newsroom South East.

Presenters
Richard Bath
Penny Bustin
Sue Carpenter
Steve Clarke
Rob Curling
Sarah Greene
Deborah Hall
Sally Magnusson
Lucy Meacock
Guy Michelmore
Linda Mitchell
Jeremy Paxman
Caroline Righton
John Stapleton
Michael Wale
Bob Wellings

See also
 BBC News

References

External links
 BBC South East at TV Ark – video clips of London Plus open titles

BBC Regional News shows
Television news in London
1984 British television series debuts
1989 British television series endings